Select Medical is a healthcare company based in Pennsylvania. It owns long-term acute care and inpatient rehabilitation hospitals, as well as occupational health and physical therapy clinics. Select Medical is a subsidiary of Select Medical Holdings, which is listed on the New York Stock Exchange.

History 
The company is based in Mechanicsburg, Pennsylvania, and was co-founded in 1996 by Rocco Ortenzio and Robert Ortenzio.

In 2009, the company announced a joint venture with SSM Health Care.

In December 2012, the company announced a partnership with Emory Healthcare.

In 2013, David Chernow was appointed CEO while co-founders Robert and Rocco Ortenzio became chairmen of the company. In June, Select Medical acquired two inpatient rehabilitation facilities from GlobalRehab Management. Also in 2013, Select Medical and OhioHealth Corp announced a joint venture and reopened the OhioHealth Rehabilitation Hospital in August 2013. In December, the company announced a partnership with Cedars-Sinai and UCLA Health System to create the California Rehabilitation Institute.

In March 2014, the company announced a joint venture with TriHealth to open the TriHealth Rehabilitation Hospital in Cincinnati. In June, the company announced a joint venture with the Cleveland Clinic to operate a rehabilitation hospital in Avon, Ohio. Also in June, the company announced a joint venture with PinnacleHealth System to co-own a rehabilitation hospital.

In 2015, Select Medical completed its acquisition of Concentra, a national health care company. Also in 2015, the company announced a partnership with Ochsner Health System.

In February 2016, the company announced an agreement to swap hospitals with Kindred Healthcare. In March, the company acquired Physiotherapy Associates Holdings. In April, the company sold its Contract Therapy business to Encore Rehabilitation Services, a portfolio company of Revelstoke Capital Partners LLC.

References

Companies listed on the New York Stock Exchange
Companies based in Harrisburg, Pennsylvania
American companies established in 1996
Health care companies established in 1996
Private equity portfolio companies
Health care companies based in Pennsylvania
2001 initial public offerings